Robert Preston Meservey (June 8, 1918 – March 21, 1987) was an American stage and film actor and singer of Broadway and cinema, best known for his collaboration with composer Meredith Willson and originating the role of Professor Harold Hill in the 1957 musical The Music Man and the 1962 film adaptation; the film earned him his first of two Golden Globe Award nominations. Preston collaborated twice with filmmaker Blake Edwards, first in S.O.B. (1981) and again in Victor/Victoria (1982). For portraying Carroll "Toddy" Todd in the latter, he was nominated for the Academy Award for Best Supporting Actor at the 55th Academy Awards.

Early life
Preston was born Robert Preston Meservey in Newton, Massachusetts, the son of Ruth L. (née Rea) (1895–1973) and Frank Wesley Meservey (1899–1996), a garment worker and a billing clerk for American Express.  In high school, Preston was interested in music and he appeared in operettas.  After attending Abraham Lincoln High School in Los Angeles, he studied acting at the Pasadena Community Playhouse.

Career
Preston appeared in a stock company production of Julius Caesar and a Pasadena Playhouse production of Idiot's Delight. A Paramount Pictures attorney liked his work and recruited him to the studio.  The Los Angeles Times reported that Preston's mother was employed by Decca Records,  Bing Crosby's label, and was acquainted  with Crosby's brother Everett, a talent agent; she convinced him to watch one of Preston's performances at the Pasadena Playhouse. The result was a contract with the Crosby agency and a movie deal with Paramount Pictures, Crosby's studio. Preston made his screen debut in 1938, in the crime dramas King of Alcatraz (1938) and Illegal Traffic.

The studio ordered Preston to stop using his family name of Meservey. As Robert Preston, the name by which he was known for his entire professional career, he appeared in many Hollywood films, predominantly but not exclusively Westerns. He was Digby Geste in the sound remake of Beau Geste (1939) with Gary Cooper and Ray Milland, and he featured in North West Mounted Police (1940), also with Cooper. He played a Los Angeles police detective in the noir This Gun for Hire (1942).

Military service
World War II interrupted Preston's Paramount assignments. Following the Japanese attack on Pearl Harbor, he joined the United States Army Air Forces and served as an intelligence officer in the U.S. 9th Air Force with the 386th Bombardment Group (Medium). At the end of the war in Europe, the 386th and Captain Robert Meservey, an S-2 Officer (intelligence), were stationed in Sint-Truiden, Belgium. Meservey's job had been receiving intelligence reports from 9th Air Force headquarters and briefing the bomber crews on what to expect in accomplishing their missions.

Return to acting
When Preston resumed his movie career in 1947, it was as a freelance character actor, accepting roles for Paramount, RKO, MGM, and various independent producers. Although Preston acted in many movies, he never became a major star. In a 1984 interview, he recalled, "I played the lead in all the B pictures and the villain in all the epics. After a while, it was clear to me I had sort of reached what I was going to be in movies." Preston found additional roles in 1950s television.

Success on stage, new projects
Robert Preston is probably best known for his performance as Professor Harold Hill in Meredith Willson's musical The Music Man (1957). "They'd run through all the musical comedy people before they cast me," Preston remembered years later. He won a Tony Award for his performance. Preston appeared on the cover of Time on July 21, 1958.  He continued in the role until January 1959, when he was replaced by Eddie Albert for 18 months. In June 1960, Preston returned to the role for two weeks, until his successor, Bert Parks, became available. Parks finished the run while Preston was in Hollywood, busy with the film version of the show.

Warner Bros. executive Jack L. Warner wanted to cast James Cagney, Cary Grant, or Frank Sinatra for the lead in the movie. Warner was foiled by author-composer Meredith Willson, who had cast approval written into his contract for the property. Willson threatened to void the contract unless Robert Preston was cast. Warner was forced to comply.

In 1961, Preston was asked to make a recording as part of a program by the President's Council on Physical Fitness to encourage schoolchildren to do more daily exercise. Copies of the recording of the song, Chicken Fat, written and composed by Meredith Willson, performed by Preston with full orchestral accompaniment, were distributed to elementary schools across the nation and played for students as they performed calisthenics. The song later became a surprise novelty hit and part of many baby-boomers' childhood memories.

In 1962, Preston played an important supporting role, as wagonmaster Roger Morgan, in MGM's epic How the West Was Won. That same year he appeared as Pancho Villa in a musical called We Take the Town, which closed during its Philadelphia tryout and never made it to Broadway.

In 1965, he was the male part of a duo-lead musical, I Do! I Do! with Mary Martin, for which he won his second Tony Award. He played the title role in the musical Ben Franklin in Paris, and he originated the role of Henry II in the stage production of The Lion in Winter, whom Peter O'Toole portrayed in the film version, receiving an Academy Award nomination. In 1974, he starred alongside Bernadette Peters in Jerry Herman's Broadway musical Mack & Mabel as Mack Sennett, the famous silent film director. That same year, the film version of Mame, another famed Jerry Herman musical, was released with Preston starring, alongside Lucille Ball, in the role of Beauregard Burnside. In the film, which was not a box-office success, Preston sang "Loving You", which Herman wrote especially for Preston's film portrayal.

In 1978, Preston starred in another musical that didn't make it to Broadway, The Prince of Grand Street, in which he played a matinee idol of New York's Yiddish theater who refused to renounce the roles he had played in his youth, despite having aged out of them. With a libretto and songs by Bob Merrill and direction by Gene Saks, the show closed during its Boston tryout.

In 1979, Preston portrayed a snake-handling family patriarch Hadley Chisholm in a CBS Western miniseries, The Chisholms, with Rosemary Harris as his wife, Minerva. The story chronicled the Chisholm family losing their land in Virginia and migrating to the west to begin a new life. When CBS tried to continue the saga as a series the following year, Preston reprised his role, his character dying in the fifth episode. The series, which also featured co-stars Ben Murphy, Brett Cullen, and James Van Patten, lasted only four more episodes after Preston's departure.

Preston appeared in several other stage and film musicals, including Victor/Victoria (1982), for which he received an Academy Award nomination. His other film roles include Ace Bonner in Sam Peckinpah's Junior Bonner (1972), "Big Ed" Bookman in Semi-Tough (1977), and Dr. Irving Finegarten in Blake Edwards' 1981 Hollywood satire, S.O.B. His last theatrical film role was in The Last Starfighter (1984) as an interstellar con man/military recruiter called Centauri. He said that he based his approach to the character of Centauri on that which he had taken to Professor Harold Hill. Indeed, the role of Centauri was written for him with his performance as Harold Hill in mind. In 1983, Preston played an aging gunfighter in September Gun, a CBS TV Western film opposite Patty Duke and Christopher Lloyd. He also starred in the well-received HBO 1985 movie Finnegan, Begin Again with Mary Tyler Moore. Preston's final role was in the television film Outrage! (1986); he portrayed a grief-stricken father who seeks justice for the brutal rape and murder of his daughter.

Personal life and death
Preston married actress Catherine Craig in 1940. He was an intensely private person, but he gave several interviews, especially late in his career. 

In March 1987, at age 68, Preston died of lung cancer. 

He is the subject of a 2022 biography, Robert Preston: Forever the Music Man, written by Debra Warren.

Stage productions
 Twentieth Century (June 4, 1951 - June 30, 1951)
The Male Animal (May 15, 1952 – January 31, 1953)
 Men of Distinction (April 30, 1953 – May 2, 1953)
 His and Hers (January 7, 1954 – March 13, 1954)
 The Magic and the Loss (April 9, 1954 – May 1, 1954)
 The Tender Trap (October 13, 1954 – January 8, 1955)
 Janus (November 24, 1955 – June 30, 1956)
 The Hidden River (January 23, 1957 – March 16, 1957)
 The Music Man (December 19, 1957 – April 15, 1961)
 Too True to be Good (March 12, 1963 – June 1, 1963)
 Nobody Loves an Albatross (December 19, 1963 – June 20, 1964)
 Ben Franklin in Paris (October 27, 1964 – May 1, 1965)
 The Lion in Winter (March 3, 1966 – May 21, 1966)
 I Do! I Do! (December 5, 1966 – June 15, 1968)
 Mack & Mabel (October 6, 1974 – November 30, 1974)
 Sly Fox (December 14, 1976 – February 19, 1978)
 The Prince of Grand Street (March 7, 1978 – March 25, 1978, Philadelphia; March 28, 1978 – April 15, 1978, Boston; closed during pre-Broadway tryouts)

Filmography

 King of Alcatraz (1938) as Robert MacArthur
 Illegal Traffic (1938) as Charles Bent Martin
 Disbarred (1939) as Bradley Kent
 Union Pacific (1939) as Dick Allen
 Beau Geste (1939) as Digby Geste
 Typhoon (1940) as Johnny Potter
 North West Mounted Police (1940) as Ronnie Logan
 Moon Over Burma (1940) as Chuck Lane
 The Lady from Cheyenne (1941) as Steve Lewis
 Parachute Battalion (1941) as Donald Morse
 New York Town (1941) as Paul Bryson, Jr.
 The Night of January 16th (1941) as Steve Van Ruyle
 Pacific Blackout (1941) as Robert Draper
 Star Spangled Rhythm (1942) as Himself (uncredited)
 Reap the Wild Wind (1942) as Dan Cutler
 This Gun for Hire (1942) as Michael Crane
 Wake Island (1942) as Pvt. Joe Doyle
 Night Plane from Chungking (1943) as Capt. Nick Stanton
 Wings Up (1943) 
 The Macomber Affair (1947) as Francis Macomber
 Variety Girl (1947) as Himself
 Wild Harvest (1947) as Jim Davis
 Big City (1948) as Rev. Philip Y. Andrews
 Blood on the Moon (1948) as Tate Riling
 Whispering Smith (1948) as Murray Sinclair
 Tulsa (1949) as Brad Brady
 The Lady Gambles (1949) as David Boothe
 The Sundowners (1950) as James Cloud ('Kid Wichita')
 When I Grow Up (1951) as Father Reed
 Cloudburst (1951) as John Graham
 Best of the Badmen (1951) as Matthew Fowler
 My Outlaw Brother (1951) as Joe Waldner
 Face to Face (1952) as Sheriff Jack Potter
 The Last Frontier (1955) as Col. Frank Marston
 Sentinels in the Air (1956) (narrator)
 The Dark at the Top of the Stairs (1960) as Rubin Flood
 The Music Man (1962) as Harold Hill
 How the West Was Won (1962) as Roger Morgan
 Island of Love (1963) as Steve Blair
 All the Way Home (1963) as Jay Follett
 Junior Bonner (1972) as Ace Bonner
 Child's Play (1972) as Joseph Dobbs
 Mame (1974) as Beauregard Jackson Pickett Burnside
 Semi-Tough (1977) as Big Ed Bookman
 The Chisholms (1979-1980, TV Series) as Hadley Chisholm
 S.O.B. (1981) as Dr. Irving Finegarten
 Victor/Victoria (1982) as Carroll "Toddy" Todd
 Rehearsal for Murder (1982, TV Movie) as Alex Dennison
 September Gun (1983, TV Movie) as Ben Sunday
 The Last Starfighter (1984) as Centauri
 Finnegan Begin Again (1985, TV Movie) as Mike Finnegan
 Outrage! (1986, TV Movie) as Dennis Riordan

Radio appearances

Honors and awards

Film

Theater

References

External links

 
 
 
 Photographs and literature

1918 births
1987 deaths
American male film actors
American male musical theatre actors
United States Army Air Forces personnel of World War II
Deaths from lung cancer in California
Actors from Newton, Massachusetts
Male actors from Los Angeles
Tony Award winners
United States Army Air Forces officers
20th-century American male actors
20th-century American singers
20th-century American male singers
Military personnel from Massachusetts